St Leonard's mill was a post mill at Winchelsea, East Sussex, England which was blown down in the Great Storm of 1987.

History

St Leonard's Mill was built in 1760, originally standing in Iham. It was shown at that site on the 1808 Ordnance Survey map, and was still there in 1813. By 1823 the mill had been moved to the new site, which was on the remains of St Leonard's church. An accident when fitting a new stock to the mill in 1861 resulted in the death of Benjamin King, millwright. The mill was working until the 1890s and was derelict by the 1920s. It was repaired in 1935 and dummy sails fitted, which did not last long. The mill was again repaired in 1955. The National Trust became custodians of the mill in 1975. In February 1978, the back of the mill was blown out in a gale. The windmill was blown down on the morning of 16 October 1987. The wreckage of the mill was still to be seen on site the following March. One of the millstones was salvaged and used in the restoration of Lowfield Heath Windmill. The site of the windmill is now marked by Winchelsea's Millennium Beacon.

Description

St Leonard's Mill was a post mill with a single storey roundhouse, It was winded by a roof mounted fantail. The mill had two Spring sails and two Common sails carried on a wooden Windshaft. The mill was the last in Sussex to retain a wooden windshaft without an iron poll end, this had been removed by 1935. Two pairs of millstones were arranged Head and Tail, with a third pair underdriven by a belt, this from an Upright Shaft which was driven by the tail wheel.

Millers
 J Sharps, 1861

References

Further reading
 Online version

External links
Ruins of St Leonard's Post Windmill shortly after the hurricane in October 1987

Windmills completed in 1823
Post mills in the United Kingdom
Grinding mills in the United Kingdom
Windmills in East Sussex
1760 establishments in England
Buildings and structures demolished in 1987
Winchelsea